Karma is a 2010 Indian Telugu-language supernatural thriller film directed by newcomer Adivi Sesh, who stars opposite American actress Jade Tailor.

Cast 
Adivi Sesh as Dev
Jade Tailor as Padma
Sher Ali as Raj
Ramakrishna as Padma's father
Ria as young Padma
Rashmi as Padma's mother's friend

Production 
The film marks the directorial and lead acting debut of Adivi Sesh, an Indian who grew up in San Francisco. Hollywood actress Jade Tailor auditioned for the film after seeing the film's synopsis on an advertisement. The film was shot in Big Sur, Carmel, and Pacifica. The film was shot in a single schedule of fifty-eight days with a crew of Hollywood and Indian technicians. James Laxton shot the film using a Red 4K camera. Telugu tutors helped Jade Tailor learn the Telugu language. The film was based on a car crash that Adivi Sesh had survived in San Francisco. This film was reportedly the first Telugu film to be completely shot in the United States and the first to release in the United States with subtitles.

Soundtrack 
The songs are composed by Hollywood musicians Pete Wonder, Leland Thunes, and Justin Durban. The soundtrack consists of six songs, two of which are background songs.

Release 
A critic from Rediff wrote that "Karma is a tale told in a modern way, weaving in Hindu mythology. This perhaps stemmed from the fact that the director-cum-actor Sesh Adivi had a miraculous escape on a US freeway which set him thinking. That was the germ of Karma". A critic from Full Hyderabad wrote that "You might want to give Karma a try to look at the little offbeat activity that goes on in Telugu cinema, but we wouldn't recommend it for good entertainment at all".

References

External links 

Indian supernatural thriller films
2010s supernatural thriller films
2010s Tamil-language films
2010 directorial debut films
2010 films